David Gregory is an American author of Christian fiction. David is a native of Texas.

Selected works

Fiction
Dinner with a Perfect Stranger: An Invitation Worth Considering WaterBrook Press, 2005.
Day with a Perfect Stranger WaterBrook Press, 2006.
The Next Level: a Parable of Finding Your Place in Life WaterBrook Press, 2008.
The Last Christian WaterBrook Press, 2010
Night with a Perfect Stranger, Worthy Publishing, March 2012

Non-fiction
The Marvelous Exchange
The Rest of the Gospel: When the Partial Gospel Has Worn You Out (coauthored with Dan Stone)

Adaptations
Two of his works were adapted to film.
Dinner with a Perfect Stranger was the inspiration for The Perfect Stranger, a film directed by Shane Shooter and Jefferson Moore. His novel, Day with a Perfect Stranger which was a sequel to Dinner with a Perfect Stranger was the inspiration for the film Another Perfect Stranger, also directed by Shooter and Moore. Another sequel followed, The Perfect Gift, although it was not based on a book.

References

Christian novelists
Writers from Texas
Writers from Oregon
Living people
Year of birth missing (living people)